Chikezie Ndubuisi Eze (born September 11, 1985) is an American singer and the tenth place finalist on the seventh season  of the television series American Idol.

Early life
Chikezie was born in Inglewood, California to Nigerian parents, attended high school at the Los Angeles Center for Enriched Studies in West LA and Bethel College in Kansas. Before auditioning for American Idol, he was a Transportation Security Administration screener and a cashier. He also attended Santa Monica College in Santa Monica, California.

American Idol

Season 6
He previously auditioned for the show's sixth season and made into the Hollywood Round, where he was cut before the top 40.  He was good friends with Danny Noriega, who was also in the Hollywood Rounds for Season 6.

Season 7
Holding number 613, Chikezie successfully auditioned again for Season 7 of American Idol and made the top 24 and then the top 12. He was eliminated from American Idol on March 26, 2008, coming in tenth place. He was in the bottom 3 with Jason Castro and Syesha Mercado, who both made the top 4. According to his AmericanIdol.com profile, his musical influences are Donny Hathaway, Stevie Wonder, Marvin Gaye, John Legend, Sam and Dave and others.  While on American Idol he roomed with David Archuleta.

Performances

Discography

Singles
These are his most downloaded songs and performances from iTunes:
2008:"She's a Woman"
2008:"I've Just Seen a Face"
2008:"I Believe to My Soul"

Tours
2008: American Idols LIVE! Tour 2008
2009: American Stars In Concert - Wings Stadium, Kalamazoo, MI March 26, 2009

Post Idol
After his elimination, Chikezie made appearances on Live with Regis and Kelly, The Morning Show with Mike and Juliet, and The Ellen DeGeneres Show.

Chikezie completed the American Idols LIVE! Tour 2008 which covered over 50 cities from July 1 to September 13, 2008.

Chikezie is mentioned in the skit Metaphor by nerdcore rapper mc chris.

During an interview for LifeScript, Chikezie announced he recently went vegan to avoid future health problems.

He hosted a special called American Idols: Where Are They Now? on TV Guide Channel succeeding Sanjaya Malakar.

On March 19, 2009, Chikezie confirmed via interview that he is working on an album that will be released "sometime in the next 3 months". He also stated that he has had various offers from a few labels, but denied them, claiming that they wanted him to be a certain way. He stated that his album is going to be a "culmination of everything I've learned as far as musically and style-wise". He also stated that he has plans to tour for his album's release. As of July, 2014 no album has been released.

During August 2009, Chikezie taped with the soap opera General Hospital playing a singer.

Personal life

Legal issues
Chikezie was arrested on February 25, 2010 and charged with felony identity theft, after he attempted to purchase $1,289.57 worth of perfume at a Neiman Marcus store in Beverly Hills, California using a fake credit card. He was held on $50,000 bail.

He pled nolo contendere to misdemeanor identity theft and was ordered to perform 45 days of community service, serve three years' probation and stay out of Neiman Marcus.

His probation was revoked and an arrest warrant issued after he failed to show for a court hearing in January 2011.

Marriage and family 
Chikezie is married to Linda Iruke, with whom he has two children. The two wed on May 10, 2011 in Ladera Heights, California.

The couple separated in June 2017 and eight months later in March 2018, Iruke was granted a restraining order after she alleged Chikezie had threatened her.

Chikezie filed for divorce in May 2018 citing irreconcilable differences.

Around that time, Iruke disappeared mysteriously, along with their children, and attempts to contact her or locate her were unsuccessful. In 2019, after more than a year of no contact, Eze spoke with TMZ on TV asking anyone with information on the location of his children to contact the Los Angeles Police Department's Child Abduction Unit.

References

External links
 Official profile on American Idol.com
 

1985 births
Living people
21st-century American singers
African-American male actors
20th-century African-American male singers
American people of Nigerian descent
American Idol participants
American male television actors
Musicians from Inglewood, California
Santa Monica College alumni
Singers from California
21st-century American male singers
21st-century African-American male singers